Roches is a commune in the Creuse department in the Nouvelle-Aquitaine region in central France.

Geography

Population

Sights
 The church, dating from the twelfth century.
 A fourteenth-century chapel at Chapelle-Malvalaise.
 The nineteenth-century chapel of Notre-Dame, at Richefolle.

See also
Communes of the Creuse department

References

Communes of Creuse